Major-General Patrick Campbell (1779–1857) was a Scottish army officer and diplomat born in Duntrune.

Patrick Campbell was born into a military family. His father was Neil Campbell (1736–1791), and his two older brothers were James Campbell (1773–1799) and Neil Campbell (1776–1827), all of whom served in the military. Patrick Campbell's service started under Ralph Abercromby in the West Indies. In 1800 he became brigade major to the Royal Artillery in Gibraltar. In 1809, he volunteered to serve with the Spanish Army in the Peninsular War, and took part in several battles, notably the Battle of Talavera. In 1811 he raised and commanded a Spanish Light Infantry Regiment, and in 1813–14 he commanded a Spanish Brigade in the field and was promoted lieutenant colonel and awarded the Order of Charles III as well as the Laureate Cross of Saint Ferdinand. However, he ended his military career in 1823, and entered the Diplomatic Service. He was appointed Secretary of Legation in Colombia on the 29 of December in 1826, and then Agent and Consul-General in Egypt on the 7 of January in 1833. He retired on the 13 of August in 1841. "Campbell's Chamber" in the Great Pyramid of Giza was named in his honour by its discoverer Howard Vyse.

References 
General
 
Specific

1779 births
1857 deaths
British consuls-general in Egypt
British people of the Napoleonic Wars
Royal Artillery officers
Scottish diplomats
Date of death unknown
Place of death unknown
Date of birth unknown
Laureate Cross of Saint Ferdinand
Ambassadors of the United Kingdom to Colombia
Spanish military personnel of the Napoleonic Wars
19th-century British diplomats
Scottish soldiers